G. maxima may refer to:

 Gallotia maxima, an extinct lizard
 Glyceria maxima, a perennial grass
 Gonepteryx maxima, an Asian butterfly
 Gymnosoma maxima, a tachina fly